Stuart Reardon is an English fitness model and former professional rugby league footballer who most recently played for the North Wales Crusaders.

Playing career
Reardon turned professional from West Bowling A.R.L.F.C. (in West Bowling, Bradford) to sign for the Bradford Bulls in 2000, he shot to prominence in late 2002 when former Bradford Bulls assistant coach Karl Harrison took over as head coach of the Salford City Reds, and signed Reardon to boost the Salford City Reds' fight against relegation.

He enjoyed a rapid rise from Academy to Super League and Test rugby league between 2002 and 2004. Though the Salford City Reds were unable to escape the drop, Reardon earned a call up to the England 'A' tour of Fiji and Tonga, where he worked with Warrington Wolves coach Paul Cullen.

He returned to the Bradford Bulls in 2003 and found a place in the first team after a long term injury to Michael Withers, making 20 appearances in the title-winning Bradford Bulls team, including being  in the 2003 Super League Grand Final against Wigan Warriors in which he scored a try. Reardon scored a try and won the Harry Sunderland Trophy for his man of the match performance at the Old Trafford showdown. Reardon represented England 'A' while at the Bradford Bulls in the 2003 European Nations Cup against Wales and France. Having won Super League VIII, Bradford played against 2003 NRL Premiers, the Penrith Panthers in the 2004 World Club Challenge. Reardon played from the interchange bench in the Bradford Bulls' 22–4 victory. He broke into the Great Britain squad for the 2004 Tri Nations series, and scored four tries in the tournament. Reardon won caps for Great Britain while at the Bradford Bulls in 2004 against Australia (3-matches), and New Zealand (2-matches), and won caps for England while at the Bradford Bulls in 2005 against France, and New Zealand (interchange/substitute). He missed the back end of 2005's Super League X with injury but made the England team at the end of the season, and toured Australia and New Zealand as a stand-by for the Great Britain squad in 2006. Paul Cullen described as the 'best kick returner in Super League' during 2006's Super League XI, Reardon was the Warrington Wolves leading tackle-buster with 66 in his first year at the club. 
He won the double with AS Carcassonne in France in 2012 – ( French Elite League champions and French Elite Cup winners ) He won the double in 2013 with North Wales Crusaders – ( Championship 1 champions and Championship bowl cup winners. )

Modelling and Training career

Stuart Reardon is currently the face of Axiom for Men, a men's grooming product range. He also appears in many magazines including DNA, Muscle & Fitness, Gloss, Q Vegas, EILE Magazine and many more. He's worked with photographers in Los Angeles, Las Vegas, New York and Great Britain.

Stuart runs an online training program, Fear Nothing Fitness, featuring body weight workout videos.

References

External links
Stuart Reardon's Official Site
Reardon set for Warrington switch at bbc.co.uk
Unflappable Reardon rises to the occasion at bbc.co.uk
(archived by web.archive.org) North Wales Crusaders profile

1981 births
Living people
AS Carcassonne players
Bradford Bulls players
Crusaders Rugby League players
England Knights national rugby league team players
England national rugby league team players
English male models
English rugby league players
Featherstone Rovers players
Great Britain national rugby league team players
North Wales Crusaders players
Rugby league centres
Rugby league fullbacks
Rugby league players from Bradford
Rugby league wingers
Salford Red Devils players
Warrington Wolves players